Nai Nabhannu La 4 is a 2016 Nepalese romance film written and directed by Bikash Raj Acharya. It is the fourth film in the Nai Nabhannu La series, following Nai Nabhannu La (2010), Nai Nabhannu La 2 (2014) and Nai Nabhannu La 3 (2015). The film marks the debut of Paul Shah, Barsha Raut and Aanchal Sharma in the lead roles along with Priyanka Karki, Anubhav Regmi and Saroj Khanal in lead roles. The film released in Nepal, Australia and USA on 8 April 2016. The film met with mixed response from critics but overwhelming response from audience. The film was a blockbuster at box office and film turned Barsha Raut and Aanchal Sharma a star while boosted the stardom of lead actor  Paul Shah who was very popular owing to his stardom from music videos. The film is also one of the highest grossing Nepali film in Nepal.

Plot
Neer (Paul Shah), Protagonist a heart broken young man running away from police invaded the house where Aani (Priyanka Karki) and Shishir (Anubhav Regmi) live. When Ani asks him about his past and reason behind running away from police Neer tells them that he and Aanchal (Aanchal Sharma) were in relationship and they are about to marry. On the marriage day, Aanchal was kidnapped and raped by the stranger, Aanchal was broken and commit suicide by jumping from the building. Neer killed all the stranger and ran away thus taking revenge.
Anjana (Barsha Raut) who is the niece of Aani, falls in love with Neer for his innocence. After the enormous try, Anjana help Neer to back in his real life. But the incharge of the murder case turns out to none other than her father (Saroj Khanal), who when comes to visit Aani and Anjana finds that Neer is hiding in their house. After some dramatic events, Neer runs from the house and is chased by police, where he gets killed by Anjana's father. Anjana is shattered and deeply heartbroken. She becomes mentally ill. She then aftermath always visits Neer's coffin and dedicates her life to Neer in tragedic climax.

Cast

Soundtrack

References

External links

Nepalese romantic comedy films
2016 romantic drama films
Nepalese sequel films
Films set in Nepal